Clux is a former commune in the Saône-et-Loire department in the region of Bourgogne in eastern France. On 1 January 2015, Clux and La Villeneuve merged becoming one commune called Clux-Villeneuve.

See also
Communes of the Saône-et-Loire department

References

Former communes of Saône-et-Loire